Friends of Canadian Broadcasting (FRIENDS) is a Canadian advocacy group that monitors developments in the Canadian television and radio broadcasting industries. The group promotes expansion of public broadcasting, investment in Canadian content, and production of local news while opposing concentration of media ownership and foreign ownership of Canadian broadcasters.

FRIENDS also presents the Dalton Camp Award, named in honour of journalist and political commentator Dalton Camp. The $10,000 award is presented to the winner of an essay competition on the link between Canadian media and democracy. The group is non-partisan.

See also
 Canadian Radio League
 Media in Canada

External links
 

Political advocacy groups in Canada
Radio organizations in Canada
Television organizations in Canada